Alfons Hellemans (born 7 August 1939) is a Belgian racing cyclist. He rode in the 1963 Tour de France.

References

1939 births
Living people
Belgian male cyclists
Place of birth missing (living people)